Pir or PIR may refer to:

Places
 Pir, Kerman, a village in Kerman Province, Iran
 Pir, Satu Mare, commune in Satu Mare County, Romania

Religion
 Pir (Alevism), one of the 12 ranks of Imam in Alevism
 Pir (Sufism), a Sufi teacher or spiritual leader
 Pir (Zoroastrianism), pilgrimage site in Persia, typically Zoroastrian

Science and technology
 PIR (gene), for a human protein that is a possible transcriptional coregulator
 Parrot intermediate representation, one of the two assembly languages for the Parrot virtual machine
 Partners in Research, Canadian bio-medical research charity
 Passive infrared sensor, detects infrared emission
 Peak information rate, a burstable rate set on routers and switches that allow throughput overhead
 Polyisocyanurate, a plastic used for thermal insulation
 Private information retrieval, a protocol for retrieving data without revealing what was retrieved
 Protein Information Resource, database and bioinformatics resource
 Public Interest Registry, manages .org Internet domain

Other
 Pir, a song by Prakash Saput
 Pacific Imperial Railroad, a defunct railway company in California
 Performance Index Rating, a statistical formula in basketball
 Philadelphia International Records, a record company based in Philadelphia, Pennsylvania
 Philosophy in Review, an academic journal
 Phoenix International Raceway, Avondale, Arizona
 Pir of the Britons, king of the Britons
 Pir Roshan (born 1525), Pashtun warrior-poet and intellectual
 Pittsburgh Industrial Railroad, reporting mark
 Portland International Raceway, Portland, Oregon
 Pre-Islamic recent period, an archaeological assemblage in the Persian Gulf
 Prosopographia Imperii Romani, a collection of Latin inscriptions on notable Romans
 Parachute Infantry Regiment, airborne infantry unit of the United States Army
 PIR, IATA code for Pierre Regional Airport, South Dakota
 PIR, NYSE symbol for Texas-based retailer Pier 1 Imports
 Post Incident Review, a review of the chronology, events and remediation for a system fault

See also 
 Pirs (disambiguation)